La Metálica (born November 13, 1994) is the ring name of a Mexican luchadora enmascarada, or masked female professional wrestler who works for the Mexican professional wrestling promotion Consejo Mundial de Lucha Libre (CMLL) portraying a técnico ("Good guy") wrestling character. La Metálica's given name is not a matter of public record, as is often the case with masked wrestlers in Mexico where their private lives are kept concealed from the general public.

She formerly worked under the name Felina Metálica prior to joining CMLL in 2016. She is the incumbent Mexican National Women's Champion, having won the title in December 2018. Her name means "The Metallic One" in Spanish, while "Felina Metálica" means "The Metallic Feline".

Professional wrestling career
La Metálica's birth name has not been revealed, nor reported on, which is a tradition in Lucha Libre when a wrestler has not been unmasked. She made her in-ring debut on May 13, 2009, after having trained under Rocky Santana, Sadico, Judas el Traidor, Terrorista, Negro Navarro, Justiciero and Robin Maravilla for her in-ring career. One of her early high profile matches was at the Arena Lopez Mateos 45th Anniversary Show where she, Keira and Sadica defeated Ice Queen, La Hielera and La Vaquerita. Her first documented championship match took place on January 26, 2014, on a Toryumon Mexico show as Baby Star successfully defended the North Women's Championship. In June 2014, Felina Metálica first won a four-way match, defeating Mystique, Paloma Rouse, and Star Fire, then another four-way match where she defeated Crazy Star, Reina Dorada, and Yuca la Potranquita to win the vacant Producciones Sánchez  Women's Championship. On an unknown date prior to July 2014, Felina Metálica also won the DZ Women's Championship. On April 24, 2016, She outlasted La Heronina, Lilith Dark, Star Pink and Zuka to win the Copa WMC Feminil.

CMLL (2016–current)
By September 2016, Felina Metálica began working for Consejo Mundial de Lucha Libre (CMLL), Mexico's largest professional wrestling company, under the ring name "La Metálica". Her first CMLL match took place at the 2016 Leyendas Mexicanas show where she, La Amapola and La Jarochita lost to Estrellita, Marcela and Sanely. The following month, La Metálica also wrestled on CMLL's annual Día de Muertos show, where she, La Amapola and Dalys la Caribeña lost to Estrellita, Marcela, and Sanely once more. While she was under contract with CMLL, the company allowed La Metálica to work on the Mexican independent circuit when she was not needed for CMLL shows. One such independent show match saw La Metálica, La Heroina, Ludark Shaitan, and La Magnifica all risk their masks in a Lucha de Apuestas, or "bet match". La Heroina won the match, pinning La Magnifica who then had to unmask.

She finished 2016 by being one of ten women to risk either their mask or their hair in a steel cage match in the main event of the 2016 Infierno en el Ring supercard show. La Metálica was the second woman to escape the cage, keeping her mask safe while Zeuxis pinned La Vaquerita to win the match. In July 2017, CMLL celebrated female wrestler Natalia Vazquez, one of the pioneers of women's professional wrestling, by holding the Copa Natalia Vazques. The 14-woman torneo cibernetico match saw La Metálica become the second wrestler eliminated. For the CMLL 85th Anniversary Show, La Jarochita, Marcela and Princesa Sugehit defeated Dalys, Metálica and Reyna Isis on the undercard of CMLL's biggest show of the year.

On December 9, 2018, La Metálica defeated Princesa Sugehit in a best two-out-of-three falls match to win the Mexican National Women's Championship, ending Princesa Sugehit's 672-day reign as champion. In April 2019, La Metálica had an opportunity to become a double champion, but Marcela successfully defended the CMLL World Women's Championship. In August CMLL introduced the Universal Amazons Championship tournament, the female equivalence of the CMLL Universal Championship, one of CMLL's biggest tournaments of the year. La Metálica outlasted Marcela, Avispa Dorada, La Amapola, La Guerrera, La Infernal, La Seductora, Maligna, Sanely and Tiffany to qualify for the finals of the tournament. She lost to Dalys in the finals two weeks later. Dalys originally earned a CMLL World Women's Championship match against Marcela, but the champion was injured in the weeks leading up to the show. Instead. La Metálica replaced her, defending the Mexican National Women's Championship at the CMLL 86th Anniversary Show. The end saw La Metálica awkwardly pin Dalys for a three-count even though Dalys clearly did not have her shoulders down. At the 2019 Día de Muertos show, Dalys, La Metálica, and Reyna Isis defeated La Jarochita, Lluvia, and Princesa Sugehit, two falls to one.

Championships and accomplishments
Consejo Mundial de Lucha Libre
Mexican National Women's Championship (1 time)
Innovacion de Lucha Libre Mexicana 
DZ Women's Championship (1 time)
Producciones Sánchez 
Producciones Sánchez Women's Championship (1 time)
Wrestling Martín Calderón
Copa WMC Femenil (2016)

Footnotes

References

1994 births
Living people
Mexican female professional wrestlers
Masked wrestlers
Unidentified wrestlers
Professional wrestlers from Mexico City
21st-century professional wrestlers
Mexican National Women's Champions